Kostas Salapasidis (born 1 July 1978, in Australia) is an Australian former football (soccer) player.

Club career
Started a professional footballing career  with Adelaide City in Australian National Soccer League. A striker with a good eye for goal, he played for Wollongong City FC, SD Compostela and Parramatta Power.

In 2000, the controversial president of the SD Compostela, Jose Maria Caneda, decided to sign Kostas Salapasidis 100 million PTA, in his first season at the club he played 9 games scoring a single goal, worse would fare in his second season which just played 4 games without scoring, in 2001, Salapasidis returned to Australia to play the Parramatta Power from which he retired prematurely in 2003 due to an injury that dragged.

International career
Salapasidis represented Australia Under-20 in the 1997 FIFA World Youth Championship in Malaysia. He started in all three group games against Canada, Hungary, and Argentina, scoring all four goals in the 4–3 win against Argentina that secured qualification to the Round of 16. He started the Round of 16 match against Japan, a game Australia lost 1–0.

References

External links
Kostas Salapasidis at Aussie Footballers
Young Socceroo Matches for 1997 at ozfootball.net

Australian soccer players
1978 births
Soccer players from Melbourne
Australia international soccer players
Australian expatriate soccer players
Australian expatriate sportspeople in Switzerland
Expatriate footballers in Switzerland
SD Compostela footballers
Australian people of Greek descent
Living people
Adelaide City FC players
FFSA Super League players
Swiss Super League players
Association football forwards